USS Belmont is a name used more than once by the U.S. Navy:

 , a barge that served the 3d Naval District during World War I.
 , a technical research ship commissioned 2 November 1964.

References 
 

United States Navy ship names